The 1903 Dulwich by-election was a by-election held on 15 December 1903 for the British House of Commons constituency of Dulwich in South London.

Vacancy
The by-election was triggered by the death of the serving Conservative Party Member of Parliament (MP), Sir John Blundell Maple.

Candidates
The Unionist (Conservative) candidate was Dr Frederick Rutherfoord Harris, who had previously been elected MP for Monmouth Boroughs in the 1900 general election but was disqualified the next year as a result of an election petition alleging irregularities. 
The Liberal Party candidate was Charles Masterman.

Campaign

The main issue in the by-election, as with the Lewisham by-election held on the same day, was tariff reform. Harris was a supporter of Joseph Chamberlain's proposals for Imperial Preference and was supported by the Tariff Reform League. Masterman was a supporter of the Liberal party policy of Free trade. Harris's involvement in the Jameson Raid affair was raised by his opponents.

Result

See also 
 List of United Kingdom by-elections
 Dulwich constituency

References 

 The Times, 16 December 1903

Dulwich,1903
Dulwich by-election
Dulwich by-election
Dulwich,1903
By-election, 1903